Benjamin Thortan Hines (November 7, 1935 – January 13, 2021) was an American coach in Major League Baseball. He was best remembered as the batting coach for the Los Angeles Dodgers, a position he held from 1985 to 1986 and 1988–1993.

Background 
Hines played infield and catcher in the Baltimore Orioles organization with the Bluefield Orioles, Leesburg Orioles and Stockton Ports in 1960 and 1961.

He then became manager of the University of La Verne team until 1980 and won NAIA coach of the year honors in 1977. He managed the independent league team Alaska Goldpanners from 1978 to 1982.

One of the few coaches to win both the Small College World Series and win the MLB World Series.

Hines died January 13, 2021, at the age of 85.

References

External links

Dodgers.com coaches list

   

1935 births
2021 deaths
People from Hughes County, Oklahoma
Major League Baseball hitting coaches
Minor league baseball managers
Los Angeles Dodgers coaches
Houston Astros coaches
Seattle Mariners coaches
Leesburg Orioles players
Bluefield Orioles players
Stockton Ports players
La Verne Leopards baseball coaches
Alaska Goldpanners of Fairbanks players